Bianca Maria Piccinino  (Trieste, 29 January 1924) is an Italian journalist and television hostess. She was the first woman to conduct an Italian newscast, the 5:00 pm newscast.

Life and career

Born in Trieste in 1924, she graduated with a degree in biology and joined RAI in 1953 as a television writer and presenter of popular science.

In the mid-1950s she conducted the television program L'amico degli animali with Angelo Lombardi and their assistant Andalù; she was conductor of Eurovision Song Contest 1957 and 1958.

In the following years she became responsible for fashion programmes, and in 1975 she conducted with Emilio Fede the first edition of the TG1 programme. On 29 July 1981, she presented the live broadcast of the wedding of Prince Charles and Lady Diana Spencer for Rai 1. Against the requests for her changing to Canale 5, she stayed on Rai even after his retirement in 1989, taking care of the weekly TV magazine Moda for some years.

Currently, she teaches "Costume fashion" at the Koefia Academy in Rome and writes articles for magazines.

Orders
 San Giusto d’Oro: Trieste, 12 December 2014

Bibliography

 Il Radiocorriere TV, n° 31 of 1957

References

External links 

 

1924 births
Italian television presenters
Italian television journalists
Italian women television presenters
Italian women journalists
Mass media people from Trieste
University of Trieste alumni
Living people